Khak-e Sefidi (also Romanized as Khāk-e Sefīdī; also known as Khāk-e Sefīd) is a village in Qorqori Rural District, Qorqori District, Hirmand County, Sistan and Baluchestan Province, Iran. At the 2006 census, its population was 982, in 191 families.

References 

Populated places in Hirmand County